Events from the year 1547 in art.

Events
 Edward VI of England issues Reformation injunctions which leads to the destruction of many rood screens, and many religious works painted over

Works

Paintings

 Lucas Cranach the Elder – Last Supper (Wittenberg)
 Gianfrancesco Penni – Lust
 Andrea Schiavone – Adoration of the Magi
 Tintoretto – Esther Before Ahasuerus
 Titian
Saint John the Evangelist on Patmos
Venus and Musician (original version, possibly lost)

Births
date unknown
Jacopo Ligozzi, Italian painter, illustrator, designer, and miniaturist of the late Renaissance and early Mannerist styles (died 1627)
Matteo Perez d'Aleccio, Italian painter of devotional, historical and maritime subjects (died 1616)
Unkoku Togan, Japanese painter (died 1618)
probable
Nicholas Hilliard, English goldsmith and limner best known for his portrait miniatures (died 1619)
Jan Soens, Dutch painter from 's-Hertogenbosch (died 1611)
Ding Yunpeng, Chinese painter especially of human figures and landscapes (died 1628)

Deaths
June 21 – Sebastiano del Piombo (byname of Sebastiano Luciani), Italian Renaissance-Mannerist painter who combined the influences of the Venetian school and the Roman school (born 1485)
August 3 – Fra Paolo da Pistoia, Italian painter and Dominican friar (born 1490)
August 31 - Nicola Filotesio, Italian painter, architect and sculptor (born 1480)
October 14 - Perino del Vaga, Italian painter (born 1501)
December 23 - Pellegrino da San Daniele, Italian painter in the late-Quattrocento and Renaissance styles (born 1467)
date unknown
Jörg Breu the Younger, German painter, son of Jörg Breu the Elder (born 1510)
Giovanni Cariani, Italian painter of the high-Renaissance (born 1490)
probable - Antonio Semini, Italian painter active in his native Genoa (born 1485)

References

 
Years of the 16th century in art